Riot is a 1997 American television film starring Luke Perry and Mario Van Peebles. It was written and directed by four writers and directors of four different racial groups prominent in Los Angeles. The title "Riot" refers to the Los Angeles riots of 1992 that were sparked by the beating of Rodney King, and the subsequent acquittal of the four police officers who beat him.

Plot
The film dissects the aftermath of the Rodney King verdict and the ensuing riots through four narratives. A Chinese liquor store owner tries to come to an understanding with his assimilating teenage son who sees his father's old world ways and non-aggressive Buddhism as signs of weakness. A Hispanic teenager tries to live a straight life and do well in school so he will not make the same mistakes his older brother had made, and be able to provide as best he can for his current and future family. A white LAPD officer struggles with obligations from his new girlfriend and not-quite-ex-wife, while confronting a surprisingly gung ho attitude from his fellow officers. An African American middle class man who has recently moved his new family out of "the ghetto", visits the store his father used to own in the old neighborhood and seeks to give some good news to his mother who has vivid memories from living through the Watts riots less than thirty years prior. These four stories are nominally separate vignettes, but interact with each other throughout the film.

Cast

See also
 1992 Los Angeles Riot
 1965 Watts Riot

References

External links
 
 

1997 television films
1997 films
1990s crime drama films
American crime drama films
Films set in 1992
Films set in Los Angeles
Hood films
1997 drama films
American drama television films
1990s English-language films
1990s American films